Joe Bonomo is an American essayist and music writer.

Life

Bonomo was born and raised in Wheaton, Maryland. He graduated from University of Maryland (BA) and Ohio University (MA and PhD).

His books include No Place I Would Rather Be: Roger Angell and a Life in Baseball Writing, Field Recordings from the Inside (essays),This Must Be Where My Obsession with Infinity Began (essays), AC/DC's Highway to Hell (33 Series), Jerry Lee Lewis: Lost and Found, Installations (National Poetry Series), Sweat: The Story of The Fleshtones, America’s Garage Band, and the interviews collection Conversations with Greil Marcus (Literary Conversations Series). Lost and Found and Sweat have been translated into French and published in France, the latter as The Fleshtones: Histoire d'un Groupe de Garage Américain.

He has published personal essays widely since the mid-1990s in Creative Nonfiction, The Normal School, Fourth Genre, Brevity, Defunct, Hotel Amerika, Diagram, Free Verse, Georgia Review, Gulf Coast, Laurel Review, Quarter After Eight, River Teeth, Seneca Review, Sentence, and elsewhere, and in the anthologies Brief Encounters: An Anthology of Short Nonfiction, How to Write About Music: Excerpts from the 33 1/3 Series, Magazines, Books and Blogs with Advice from Industry-Leading Writers, and The Rose Metal Press Field Guide to Prose Poetry: Contemporary Poets in Discussion and Practice.

In 2012 Bonomo was named the music columnist for The Normal School literary magazine, for which he writes two essays annually.

Since 1995 he has taught writing creative nonfiction and literature at Northern Illinois University.  He lives with his wife, Amy Newman, a professor, translator, and poet, in DeKalb, Illinois.

Books
 Sweat: The Story of the Fleshtones, America's Garage Band (Bloomsbury, 2007)
 Installations (National Poetry Series, Penguin Books, 2008)
 Jerry Lee Lewis: Lost and Found (Bloomsbury, 2009)
 AC/DC's Highway to Hell (33 Series, Continuum Intl Pub Group, 2010)
 Conversations with Greil Marcus (Literary Conversations Series, University Press of Mississippi, 2012)
 This Must Be Where My Obsession with Infinity Began, essays (Orphan Press, 2013)
 Field Recordings from the Inside, essays (Soft Skull Press, 2017)
 No Place I Would Rather Be: Roger Angell and a Life in Baseball Writing (University of Nebraska Press, 2019)

Awards
 Illinois Arts Council Fellowships
 Award for Excellence in Undergraduate Instruction (Northern Illinois University)
 National Poetry Series
 Orphan Press Creative Nonfiction Book Award

References

External links
 Official website,  No Such Thing As Was
 Joe Bonomo on Twitter
 Joe Bonomo's essay "Live Nude Essay!" in Gulf Coast: A Journal of Literature and Fine Arts (24.1).

Year of birth missing (living people)
Living people
American non-fiction writers
Writers from Maryland
University of Maryland, College Park alumni
Ohio University alumni
Northern Illinois University faculty
People from Wheaton, Maryland